Muhammad Talal Chaudhry (born 19 August 1970) is a Pakistani politician. He was a member of the National Assembly of Pakistan, from June 2013 to May 2018.He served as the Federal Parliamentary Secretary for Information Technology and Science and Technology in the cabinet of Nawaz Sharif from 2013 to 2017. He served as Minister of State for Interior, in Abbasi cabinet from August 2017 to May 2018.

Early life
Talal was born on 19 August 1970. He is the nephew of EX Provisional Minister for Auqaf, Zakat & Ushr Chaudhry Muhammad Akram (PP-46 – Faisalabad)1990.

Political career
He ran for the seat of the National Assembly of Pakistan as a candidate of Pakistan Muslim League (N) (PML-N) from Constituency NA-77 (Faisalabad-III) in 2008 Pakistani general election but was unsuccessful. He received 49,807 votes and lost the seat to Muhammad Asim Nazir. In the same election, he ran for the seat of the Provincial Assembly of the Punjab
as an independent candidate from Constituency PP-53 (Faisalabad-III) and from Constituency PP-55 (Faisalabad-V)

He was elected to the National Assembly as a candidate of PML-N from Constituency NA-76 (Faisalabad-II) in 2013 Pakistani general election. He received 101,797 votes and defeated Malik Nawab Sher Wasseer, a candidate of Pakistan Peoples Party (PPP) with a lead of 60,000+ votes. During his tenure as Member of the National Assembly, he served as the Federal Parliamentary Secretary for  Information Technology and  Science and Technology.

Following the election of Shahid Khaqan Abbasi as Prime Minister of Pakistan in August 2017, he was inducted into the federal cabinet of Abbasi as Minister of State for Interior. Upon the dissolution of the National Assembly on the expiration of its term on 31 May 2018, Chaudhry ceased to hold the office as Minister of State for Interior.

In March 2018, the Supreme Court of Pakistan indicted Chaudhry for committing contempt of court. Chuadhry rejected the contempt allegations. In August 2018, the Supreme Court found Chaudhry guilty of contempt of court and disqualified him from holding public office and from contesting elections for five years. This judgment was believed to be a result of political victimisation the judgment later increased Tallal Chaudry’s popularity because the public was convinced that it was a result of him being loyal to his leadership and party. The three-judge bench also slapped him a fine of Rs 100,000. In September 2018, he challenged the verdict of the Supreme Court.

In 2018 Pakistani general election Talal lost his seat NA-102 securing 97869 votes against Pakistan Tehreek-e-Insaf candidate Malik Nawab Sher Waseer.

Tallal chaudry is energetic and out-put-driven experienced politician having diverse academic background in law, business administration and strategic management coupled with extensive experience in analyzing and appraising different projects.

2020 physical assault incident
In September 2020, Chaudhry sustained serious injuries after he was physically assaulted by unidentified individuals outside the house of Ayesha Rajab Ali. Shahbaz Gill claimed Chaudhry was harassing Ayesha Rajab Ali which led the latter's family to attack the former. According to media reports, there was an affair between Chaudhry and Ayesha Rajab Ali.

Electoral history

2018

References

Living people
Pakistan Muslim League (N) MNAs
Punjabi people
1973 births
Pakistani MNAs 2013–2018